Master of Labour Welfare is a Master's degree in the subject of Labour Welfare offered by some Indian Universities.

References

Labour Welfare
Academic degrees of India
Industrial relations education